The 1957 Florida State Seminoles baseball team represented Florida State University in the 1957 NCAA University Division baseball season. The Seminoles played their home games at Seminole Field. The team was coached by Danny Litwhiler in his third season at Florida State.

The Seminoles reached the College World Series, their first appearance in Omaha, where they finished tied for seventh after dropping an opening round game against eventual runner-up Penn State and an elimination game against fifth-place Connecticut.

Personnel

Roster

Coaches

Schedule and results

References

Florida State Seminoles baseball seasons
Florida State Seminoles
College World Series seasons
Florida State Seminoles baseball